The Out & Equal Workplace Summit is an annual gathering of over 3,000 business leaders, LGBT employers, LGBT employees and other participants to discuss best practices, network and take part in training sessions. The Out & Equal Workplace Summit is hosted by Out & Equal Workplace Advocates and is held in rotating locations around the United States. The Workplace Summit is considered to be "qualified training in compliance with 5 U.S.C. Chapter 41" of the United States Office of Personnel Management.

History
Out & Equal Workplace Advocates founder Selisse Berry started the Workplace Summits as part of the United Way Bay Area. In 1999, an organization called The Pride Collaborative merged with another organization called COLLEAGUES—a national organization that sponsored the annual "Out & Equal Conference" aimed at human resource professionals and LGBT employees—thus forming Out & Equal Workplace Advocates. That same year, Progress’s Leadership Summit and COLLEAGUES’ Out & Equal Conference combined resources to produce the annual Out & Equal Workplace Summit, which is now one of the keystone programs of the organization.

After officially becoming a national 501(c)(3) nonprofit organization, Out & Equal Workplace Advocates now independently manages the Workplace Summit.

Program
Annually, the Out & Equal Workplace Summit includes workshops, plenary speakers and performances. The Summit's plenaries includes keynotes from LGBT leaders, executives and celebrities and features performances by LGBT and allied musicians.

The Workplace Summit includes an annual award ceremony aimed at recognizing leaders in LGBT workplace equality called The Outies.

References

External links
Out & Equal — official website
Out & Equal's newest program linking diversity friendly employers with top LGBT talent -Out & Equal's LGBTCareerlink

LGBT organizations in the United States
Organizations based in San Francisco
Organizations established in 1998
LGBT business organizations